David McCray (born 6 November 1986) is a German retired basketball player and current coach. He is a current assistant coach at Riesen Ludwigsburg.

His number 4 was retired by Riesen Ludwigsburg.

Professional career
In June 2014, he signed a 1-year deal with an option for another year with Artland Dragons. He previously played for Telekom Baskets Bonn.

On 19 July 2019, McCray announced his retirement. Riesen Ludwigsburg retired his jersey number 4, its first retired number in club history.

Coaching career
Following his retirement, he assumed the function of assistant coach with Riesen Ludwigsburg.

References

External links
 Eurocup Profile
 German BBL Profile
 Eurobasket Profile

1986 births
Living people
Artland Dragons players
BG Karlsruhe players
German men's basketball players
Guards (basketball)
Riesen Ludwigsburg players
People from Speyer
Sportspeople from Rhineland-Palatinate
Telekom Baskets Bonn players